Pete Fejeran (born January 20, 1971) is a retired weightlifter from Guam. He placed 22nd in the lightweight division at the 1988 Olympics.

References

1971 births
Living people
Olympic weightlifters of Guam
Weightlifters at the 1988 Summer Olympics
Guamanian male weightlifters